James Storm is an American professional wrestler.

James or Jim Storm may also refer to:

 Jim Storm (actor) (born 1943), American actor
 Jim Storm (rower) (born 1941), American rower
 Jim Storm (ice hockey) (born 1971), ice hockey player